Harvey Lloyd (born November 26, 1926) is an American photographer and the leading figure in the "Breaking the Light" abstract expressionist photographic movement. He is well known for both his realistic and abstract photography. Lloyd trained under the legendary Alexey Brodovitch and his photography spans a range of realistic styles from advertising to aerial photography to nature photography, and social photography; as well as, more recently, abstract styles.  Lloyd uses his abstract work to inform his realistic work.

Early life
Lloyd was born in Brooklyn, New York to Jewish Ukrainian immigrants. He attended public schools in New York. He spent one year at Cooper Union in New York studying graphic art and art direction.

Progression of Styles

Lloyd began his career as a graphic designer for the old American Weekly Hearst Sunday Magazine in New York. In the 1950s he created his own companies Graphic Arts Center and APA and Lloyd Inc. where he practiced traditional graphic design. In the 1960s, he attended Brodovitch's Design Laboratory in New York for graphic designers. He made slide shows for projection in the workshop using images and sound in an aleatory manner to discover serendipitous and unexpected combinations of audio-visual experiences. He then attended Brodovitch's Design Laboratory Workshops for photography. He became involved in photojournalism using a realistic traditional style of photography.

Lloyd's interest in photojournalism was accompanied by an interest in and practice of abstract photography. Initially, his approach was in the manner of traditional photographic abstraction—seeing patterns of peeling paint, tattered wall poster ads, patterns of every kind. Partly influenced by the blurred bullfighter images of his colleague Ernst Haas, Loyd's traditional still color and black-and-white photography transformed in 1995 with his first photography of the Halloween Eve parade up Sixth Avenue in Manhattan at dusk and night. He made blurred several-second exposures of the grotesquely masked witches, skeletons, etc., and fired his camera mounted flash during the long exposures. These images straddled between the real and the abstract blurred impressions. These post abstract expressionistic and post impressionist images "reinvented" the over two hundred year old "What you see is what you get" art of still film photography. He made tens of thousands of these images around Manhattan at night. "Breaking the Light" is the name for his post-abstract photographs. Each image is made during a single exposure in Lloyd's digital camera. The name "Breaking the Light" was coined in 2002 by Ivana Lovincic, photographer and current Director/Curator of Lloyd's Studio.

In 2010 Loyd moved to Santa Fe, New Mexico. From Santa Fe he traveled approximately eighty thousand thousand miles to photograph National Parks and Pueblo ruins. He used his classic still film realistic technique. However his work was influenced by Breaking the Light.  In addition, concepts from quantum physics, metaphysics and Eastern philosophy influenced the realistic work.

Major Shows
Lloyd's work has been shown at
  The Museum of Modern Art in New York City 
 The Grand Palais Museum in Paris
 The International Center of Photography in New York 
 The Museum of Northern Arizona 
 The Venice Film Festival where he won the Mercurio d'Oro, and  
 The Heard Museum in Phoenix with the installation of the multi-screen show Our Voices, Our Land
 "Harvey, I literally had goose bumps when viewing your (new Southwest images DVD) which I became recipient of only moments ago. It was nearly 30 years ago that you created the single most compelling multi-media production of any public attraction at the time... To think this show ran in the orientation theater for a good 15 years and it is still being shown in the Heard daily within their permanent exhibit! A remarkable run because of a remarkable artist and his creation that I am confident has impacted millions of lives."—Mike Fox, former director Heard Museum

Awards
The Pacific Area Travel Association's gold medal for photography of China 
 The Art Director's Club Gold and silver medals for the Royal Viking Line advertising campaign 
  CINE Golden Eagle Award 
 Mercurio d'Oro from the Venice Industrial Film Festival for Portrait of a Railroad 
 Silver Anvil from the Public Relations Society of America for photography of volunteer older teachers 
 Grand Award—Photo Essays from the German magazine Bilderzeit

Professional Positions

 Lloyd is a former president of the American Society of Media Photographers 
 One of Canon USA's distinguished Explorers of Light 
 An exhibiting member of The National Arts Club in New York City

Bibliography

Picture Books

Trade Books

Limited Edition Books

Lloyd also has a number of limited-edition, print-on-demand books of his photography.

 BREAKING THE LIGHT: Post Abstract Expressionist Photographic Images.
 BACH'S MIND: A Walk To The Stars
 LAS VEGAS DECONSTRUCTED, images from one man exhibition in Las Vegas. 
 THE TAO OF CRANES: Sandhill Cranes Bosque del Apache Wildlife Reserve. 
 DEAD SEA MIRAGES: Hidden Rainbows. 
 MOONLIGHT SONATAS: The Moon In Hyperspace. 
 MOONLIGHT NOCTURNES: Homage To Whistler
 YELLOWSTONE: The Devil's Volcano.
 SENEGAL: The Remarkable Children of the Desert Nomads
 LOG RHYTHMS: Aspen Tree Trunk Carvings		
 TOTEMS: Graffiti On The Road To The Summit
 MONUMENT VALLEY, aerial & ground level images. 
 BACH: A Christmas Oratorio
 LAS VEGAS DECONSTRUCTED
 PARADISE LOST: Petrified Logs From The Emergence of Dinosaurs
 HOLOCAUST: Yad Vashem Memorial Museum in Israel.
 FOUR SEASONS OF HENRY MOORE (At NY Botanical Garden)
 CONDOR: MACHU PICCHU, "A Life of Stone After So Many Lives."
 ULTIMATE ROSES; The Beauty and Poetry of Macro Images of Roses. 
 A TIME FOR WAR & A TIME FOR PEACE: Israel Soon After 1967 War
 THE QUANTUM GHOST: Reality & Unreality In the Art of Digital Photography. 
 DANCING WITH GHOSTS: Point Lobos Nature Reserve.
 HALLOWEEN: NYC's GIGANTIC WITCHES & DEVILS PARADE. 
 SPIRIT HOUSE: Lloyd's Studio - Spirit Figures From Around the World
 THE SERMON ON THE MOUNT: Illustrated With Cloudscapes
 THE QUANTUM EYE: Macro Holograms &The New Art of Digital Photography. 
 SAKURA: Cherry Blossoms In A Japanese Garden with Poems from Kyoto.
 BRYCE CANYON: Nature's Barber Poles and Totems

External links
 Harvey Lloyd Website, expired
 Harvey Lloyd Photoblogs

References

Living people
Artists from Santa Fe, New Mexico
Photographers from New York City
1926 births